Pakhomovo is a rural locality (a village) in Pekshinskoye Rural Settlement, Petushinsky District, Vladimir Oblast, Russia. The population was 205 as of 2010.

Geography 
Pakhomovo is located on the Nergel River, 33 km northeast of Petushki (the district's administrative centre) by road. Denisovo is the nearest rural locality.

References 

Rural localities in Petushinsky District